Manuel de Seabra (1932 in Lisbon – 22 May 2017) was a Portuguese writer, journalist, and translator. He translates Russian, Portuguese, Catalan and Esperanto. He and his wife compiled the Portuguese-Catalan/Catalan-Portuguese Dictionary. He was awarded the Creu de Sant Jordi in 2001.

Works

In Portuguese 
 Eu e o diabo (1950)
 Cântico necessário (1954)
 Terra de ninguém (1959)
 O retrato esboçado (1960)
 O fogo sagrado (1961)
 Os sobreviventes (1965)
 85 poemas realistas (1974)
 Os rios sem nome (1982) 
 A literatura indo-portuguesa (1971), amb Vimala Devi
 Os exércitos de Paluzie (1982)
 Conheces Blaise Cendrars (1984)
 Promessa às escuras (1994)
 O dia em que Jesus traiu Judas (1996)
 A reforma dos cavalos (1998)
 Bar-Mitzvah (2001)
 Odiai-vos uns aos outros (2003)

In Catalan 
 Els exèrcits de Paluzie (1982)
 Coneixes Blaise Cendrars? (1984)
 Paisatge amb figures (1986)
 Fer senyors a la Plaça Roja (1986)
 El dia que Jesús va trair Judes (1995)
 Odieu-vos els uns als altres (2004)
 Diccionari portuguès-català (1985), amb Vimala Devi
 Diccionari català-portuguès (1989), amb Vimala Devi

In Esperanto 
 Antologio de portugalaj rakontoj (redactor) (1959)
 La armeoj de Paluzie (1996)
 Promeso en obskuro (1997)
 La tago kiam Jesuo perfidis Judason (2001)
 Ĉu vi konas Blaise Cendrars? (2007)
 Malamu vin, unu la alian (2009)

References

External links
Profile from the Generalitat de Catalunya

1932 births
2017 deaths
Portuguese male writers
People from Lisbon
Portuguese Esperantists
Translators of Fernando Pessoa